Samuel Kirkland (December 1, 1741 – February 28, 1808) was a Presbyterian minister and missionary among the Oneida and Tuscarora peoples of present-day central New York State. He was a long-time friend of the Oneida chief Skenandoa.

Kirkland graduated from Princeton in 1765.  In 1793 as part of his missionary work with the Oneida tribe he founded a seminary, the Hamilton-Oneida Academy in Clinton, New York. The seminary admitted both white and Oneida boys. Kirkland named it in honor of Treasury Secretary Alexander Hamilton, who was a member of the first Board of Trustees of the Hamilton-Oneida Academy.  The Hamilton-Oneida Academy was chartered as Hamilton College in 1812 (Hamilton College). 

A student of the Iroquoian languages, Kirkland lived for many years with the Iroquois tribes. He helped negotiate the land purchases that New York State made from the Iroquois after the American Revolutionary War, acquiring his own land in the process.

Early life and education
Samuel Kirkland was born on December 1, 1741, in Norwich, Connecticut. He was educated in common schools and at Princeton (then the College of New Jersey), where he graduated in 1765.  He was soon ordained as a Presbyterian minister and wanted to work with Native Americans.

Career
Kirkland began his missionary work as a protégé of Reverend Eleazar Wheelock in Connecticut at his Moor's Indian Charity School  (later relocated to New Hampshire as Dartmouth College). Kirkland met Joseph Brant, a Mohawk who became a war leader against the rebels during the American Revolutionary War while at the school. Kirkland and Wheelock parted company in 1770. Kirkland moved to central New York, where he became a missionary to the Iroquois, especially the Oneida and Tuscarora located at the western end of the Mohawk River Valley.  He acted as an adviser and ambassador to the Iroquois during the American Revolutionary War.  At a time when four of the Six Nations allied with the British, he helped persuade the Oneida and Tuscarora to assist the American revolutionaries. 

Warfare in the Mohawk Valley caused widespread destruction in both the colonial frontier settlements and many Iroquois villages, as one side and another conducted retaliatory attacks. After the war, Kirkland maintained good relations with the Iroquois. In 1790 he was visited by the Italian explorer Paolo Andreani who reported on his observations of Kirkland and the Oneida people. Andreani noted that Kirkland had collected basic word lists of over 200 languages. He also saw how Kirkland conducted Sunday services with translated psalms. The participants were teased by other members of the tribe but the congregation was sincere and they abstained from hunting and other work on Sundays.

Kirkland played a key role in organizing purchases of lands from the Oneida on behalf of New York state, in the process securing large parcels of the Oneida land for himself and his friends. Kirkland's assistant James Dean was present at every land cession from the Oneida to the state of New York between 1785 and 1818. He was elected a Fellow of the American Academy of Arts and Sciences in 1790. Kirkland helped negotiate treaties and keep peace between the Iroquois tribes, who were relocated to smaller reservations, and whites. He is considered by many to be the peacekeeper between the Iroquois and the settlers after the war, when settlers did not sufficiently distinguish between former allies and those nations who had been enemies and responsible for destruction. In addition, the wave of migration from New England brought many Yankees eager to acquire land, and they encroached on the Iroquois both before and after land purchases by the state.

Long interested in education, in 1793 Kirkland founded the Hamilton-Oneida Academy as a boys' school in central New York to meet demand from the many new European-American settlements. (This later developed as Hamilton College.) It was a time of the development of boys' schools throughout the state, followed in the nineteenth century by girls' schools.

Marriage and family
On September 20, 1769, Samuel Kirkland married Jerusha Bingham (1743–1788) in Windham, Connecticut.  They had several children, who grew up to have leadership positions with their families and in society.  Their son, John Thornton Kirkland (1770–1840) served as President of Harvard College from 1810 to 1828.  Their eldest daughter, Jerusha Kirkland, (1776–1862) married John Hosmer Lothrop (1769–1829).

The Kirklands' granddaughter Frances Eliza Lothrop (1809–1893) married John Hiram Lathrop (1799–1866).  A graduate of Yale with a law degree, he became a teacher and, in 1840, the first President of the University of Missouri at Columbia. The couple were honored by a large memorial stained glass window in Grace and Holy Trinity Cathedral in Kansas City, Missouri, where descendants of both the Lathrops and the Kirklands are members of the Parish.

Legacy and honors
 The town of Kirkland, New York is named after Samuel Kirkland.
 Kirkland College, a former liberal arts women's college in New York that merged with Hamilton College was named for Samuel Kirkland.

References

Bibliography 

 Laurence M. Hauptman, Conspiracy of Interests: Iroquois Dispossession and the Rise of New York State, Syracuse University Press, 1999 (revised edition, 2001)

1741 births
1808 deaths
People of colonial Connecticut
Princeton University alumni
Missionary linguists
American Presbyterian missionaries
American evangelicals
Clergy in the American Revolution
Fellows of the American Academy of Arts and Sciences
Patriots in the American Revolution
Aboriginal title in New York
Religious leaders from Norwich, Connecticut
Hamilton College (New York) people
University and college founders
Presbyterian missionaries in the United States
Clinton (village), New York